Dąbrowice may refer to the following places:
Dąbrowice, Bydgoszcz County in Kuyavian-Pomeranian Voivodeship (north-central Poland)
Dąbrowice, Nakło County in Kuyavian-Pomeranian Voivodeship (north-central Poland)
Dąbrowice, Kutno County in Łódź Voivodeship (central Poland)
Dąbrowice, Gmina Maków in Łódź Voivodeship (central Poland)
Dąbrowice, Gmina Skierniewice in Łódź Voivodeship (central Poland)
Dąbrowice, Masovian Voivodeship (east-central Poland)
Dąbrowice, Greater Poland Voivodeship (west-central Poland)
Dąbrowice, Opole Voivodeship (south-west Poland)